Monopetalotaxis doleriformis is a moth of the family Sesiidae. It is known from South Africa.

The larvae bore the roots of Aspalathus linearis. They are considered one of the principal insect pest associated with rooibos or red bush tea production. Pathogenic fungi and bacteria can easily develop in the bored tunnels, causing indirect damage.

References

Endemic moths of South Africa
Sesiidae
Moths of Africa